This list containing all the companies who publish the books and magazines in Urdu language.

D

C 
 Calcutta School-Book Society, India

F 
 Ferozsons, Pakistan, founded 1894

I 
 India Book House, India
 Islamic Publishing House, India

M 
 Mayapuri Magazine, India

S 
 Sang-e-Meel Publications, Pakistan

References 

Urdu-language books
Urdu
Urdu-language literature